Epichthonodes is a genus of moths of the family Yponomeutidae.

Species
Epichthonodes caustopola - Meyrick, 1938 

Yponomeutidae